Ángela Patricia Cárdenas Román (born 19 November 1993) is a Bolivian footballer who plays as a centre back for Spanish club CAP Ciudad de Murcia and the Bolivia women's national team.

Early life
Cárdenas hails from the Santa Cruz Department.

Club career

San Martín de Porres
Cárdenas scored a goal during the 2015 Copa Libertadores Femenina. She won the Bolivian football championship the next year.

International career
Cárdenas played for Bolivia at senior level in three Copa América Femenina editions (2010, 2014 and 2018).

References

1993 births
Living people
Women's association football midfielders
Bolivian women's footballers
People from Santa Cruz Department (Bolivia)
Bolivia women's international footballers
Bolivian expatriate footballers
Bolivian expatriate sportspeople in Spain
Expatriate women's footballers in Spain